CHLK-FM, branded as Lake 88.1, is a Canadian radio station offering an adult contemporary format with a focus on local/regional news programming broadcasting at 88.1 FM in Perth, Ontario. The station was founded by Norm Wright and Brian Perkin in 2007.

The station was licensed by the Canadian Radio-television and Telecommunications Commission on March 14, 2006 and began its first official broadcast day on August 10, 2007 at 6:00am.  On December 13, 2010, the station received approval from the CRTC to increase  the average effective radiated power (ERP) from 700 to 2,800 watts (maximum ERP from 1,350 to 5,400 watts with an average height of antenna above average terrain of 91.5 metres).   Lake 88.1 increased its signal strength at 12:10pm on April 12, 2011.  In 2014, Norm Wright retired and sold his shares to partner Brian Perkin and his wife Jennifer Perkin.

CHLK-FM receives interference from WSLZ on 88.1 FM out of Cape Vincent, New York in the Westport and areas north of Kingston.

On February 26, 2021, Brian Perkin (Perth FM Radio Inc.), the owner of CHLK-FM "Lake 88.1" Perth, Ontario sold the station to My Broadcasting Corporation (MBC)  and was approved by the CRTC on March 12, 2021.

References

External links
 Lake 88.1
 
 

Hlk
Hlk
Radio stations established in 2007
2007 establishments in Ontario